Chitty-Chitty-Bang-Bang: The Magical Car is a children's novel written by Ian Fleming for his son Caspar, with illustrations by John Burningham. It was initially published in three volumes, the first of which was released on 22 October 1964 by Jonathan Cape in London.

Fleming, better known as the creator of James Bond, took his inspiration for the subject from a series of aero-engined racing cars called "Chitty Bang Bang", built by Louis Zborowski in the early 1920s at Higham Park. Fleming had known Higham Park as a guest of its later owner, Walter Whigham, chairman of Robert Fleming & Co. It was the last book he wrote and he did not live to see it published.

Chitty-Chitty-Bang-Bang was loosely adapted as a 1968 film of the same name with a screenplay by Roald Dahl and Ken Hughes; a subsequent novelisation was also published. The film was produced by Albert R. Broccoli, co-producer of the James Bond film series. The story was also adapted as a stage musical under the same name. In April 2011 a BBC Radio 4 Extra adaptation was broadcast with Imogen Stubbs as the voice of Chitty. Three sequels to Fleming's book have been published, all written by Frank Cottrell-Boyce.

Plot
Commander Caractacus Pott is an inventor who buys and renovates an old car after gaining money from inventing and selling whistle-like sweets to Lord Skrumshus, the wealthy owner of a local confectionery factory. The car, a "Paragon Panther", was the sole production of the Paragon motor-car company before it went bankrupt.  It is a four-seat touring car with an enormous bonnet, or hood.  After the restoration is complete, the car is named for the noises made by its starter motor and the characteristic two loud backfires it makes when it starts.

At first Chitty-Chitty-Bang-Bang is just a big and powerful car, but as the book progresses the car surprises the family by beginning to exhibit independent actions. This first happens while the family is caught in a traffic jam on their way to the beach for a picnic. The car suddenly instructs Commander Pott to pull a switch which causes Chitty-Chitty-Bang-Bang to sprout wings and take flight over the stopped cars on the road. Commander Pott flies them to Goodwin Sands in the English Channel where the family picnics, swims, and sleeps. While the family naps, the tide comes in threatening to drown them. Chitty-Chitty-Bang-Bang wakes them just in time with a hiss of steam. At the car's direction, Commander Pott pulls another switch which causes it to transform into a hovercraft-like vehicle. They make for the French coast and land on a beach near Calais. They explore along the beach and find a cave boobytrapped with some devices intended to scare off intruders. At the back of the cave is a store of armaments and explosives. The family detonates the cache of explosives and flees the cave.

The gangsters/gun-runners who own the ammunition dump arrive and block the road in front of Chitty-Chitty-Bang-Bang. The gangsters threaten the family, but Commander Pott throws the switch which transforms the car into an aeroplane and they take off, leaving the gangsters in helpless fury. The Potts stay overnight in a hotel in Calais. While the family sleeps, the gangsters break into the children's room and kidnap them and drive off towards Paris. Chitty tracks the gangsters' route, wakes Commander and Mrs. Pott, and they drive off in pursuit.

The gangsters are planning to rob a famous chocolate shop in Paris using the children as decoys. The Pott children overhear this and manage to warn the shop owner, Monsieur Bon-Bon. Chitty arrives in time to prevent the gangsters from fleeing. The police arrive and the gangsters are taken away. As a reward Madame Bon-Bon shares the secret recipe of her world-famous fudge with the Potts, and the two families become good friends. Chitty flies the family away to parts unknown, and the book implies that the car has yet more secrets.

Characters
Caractacus Pott – eccentric inventor and former commander in the Royal Navy
Mimsie Pott – Caractacus's wife
Jeremy and Jemima Pott – Caractacus's and Mimsie's twin eight-year-old children
Lord Skrumshus – owner of a sweet factory
Joe the Monster – leader of a criminal gang
Man-Mountain Fink – member of Joe's gang
Soapy Sam – member of Joe's gang; explosives expert, handy with gelignite.
Blood-Money Banks – member of Joe's gang; blackmailer
Monsieur Bon-Bon – owner of a famous Parisian chocolate shop and the target of Joe's gang

Background
By 1961, Fleming had published nine James Bond books. The most recent of these was Thunderball, a novel Fleming initially published under his own name, but which was the subject of a legal action by its co-authors, Kevin McClory and Jack Whittingham. In March 1961, McClory read an advance copy of the book and he and Whittingham immediately petitioned the High Court in London for an injunction to stop publication. The case was heard on 24 March 1961 and allowed the book to be published, although the door was left open for McClory to pursue further action at a later date.

Fleming had also begun to write the children's book Chitty-Chitty-Bang-Bang. The car itself was based on a composite of two cars: Fleming's own  Standard Tourer, which he had driven in Switzerland in the late 1920s, and Chitty Bang Bang, a chain-driven customised Mercedes with a 23-litre 6-cylinder Maybach aero-engine. Fleming had seen the car's owner, Louis Zborowski race at the Brooklands race track. The origin of the name "Chitty Bang Bang" is disputed, but may also have been inspired by early aeronautical engineer Letitia Chitty. Like Zborowski, Fleming names his car because of the noise it made—and the noise a car made was important to Fleming.

As he wrote the novel, Fleming used aspects of his life to flesh out the details, much as he did with many of his Bond stories. Thus, in the novel, one of the children was called Jemima, after the daughter of his previous employer, Hugo Pitman; the advice Pott gave to his children also echoed that of Fleming: "Never say 'no' to adventures. Always say 'yes', otherwise you'll lead a very dull life."

In May 1961, Fleming sent his publisher the manuscripts for the first two volumes of Chitty-Chitty-Bang-Bang. To illustrate the book, Fleming suggested the Daily Mail cartoonist Trog—the pseudonym of Wally Fawkes—as he admired the artist's work. While undertaking the preliminary drawings for the book, Trog tried to make the fudge recipe included in the book and found it was not particularly good: the editors at Jonathan Cape spent a day making up batches from different recipes to find a better one to use. Although Fawkes completed preliminary drawings for the project, the Daily Mail refused to allow him to complete the work as many of Fleming's works were serialised in its rival, the Daily Express. Other early illustrative sketches were produced by artist Haro Hodson and motor engineer Amherst Villiers. After Trog was forced to withdraw from the project, Cape commissioned John Burningham, who had recently won the 1963 Kate Greenaway Medal for his book Borka: The Adventures of a Goose with No Feathers.

On 19 November 1963, the case of McClory v Fleming, following up the 1961 case, was heard at the Chancery Division of the High Court. The proceedings lasted three weeks, during which time Fleming was unwell, suffering a heart attack as the case progressed. Two weeks after the case, during the weekly Tuesday staff conference at his employers, The Sunday Times, Fleming suffered a serious, second heart attack that necessitated convalescence, which he undertook at the Dudley Hotel in Hove. While there, one of Fleming's friends, Duff Dunbar, gave him a copy of Beatrix Potter's The Tale of Squirrel Nutkin to read and suggested that he took the time to write up the bedtime story that Fleming used to tell his son Caspar each evening. Fleming attacked the project with gusto and wrote to his publisher, Michael Howard of Jonathan Cape, joking that "There is not a moment, even on the edge of the tomb, when I am not slaving for you."

Fleming did not live to see Chitty-Chitty-Bang-Bang published: he suffered a further heart attack on 11 August 1964 and died in the early morning of the following day—his son Caspar's twelfth birthday—in Canterbury, Kent. The book was published two months after his death.

Release and reception
Chitty-Chitty-Bang-Bang was first published in the UK in three hard-backed volumes by Jonathan Cape, each costing 10s. 6d. The first volume was launched on Thursday, 22 October 1964, the second on 26 November 1964 and the third on 14 January 1965. In July 1968, the three volumes were released in one single volume by Pan Books.

Reviews
Alexander Muir, in the Daily Mirror, considered that the first two volumes of Chitty-Chitty-Bang-Bang, "would make wonderful Christmas presents for everybody's young ones", declaring that they were "thrilling cliff-hanger adventures". Writing in The Guardian, John Rowe Townsend was damning of the book, saying of the car "I don't care for her much, or the values she stands for" and, of the writing, that "we have the adult writer at play rather than the children's writer at work. The style is avuncular, the writing down too evident."

The reviewer for The Times noted that "junior Bonds-men ... can cut their teeth on" the novel. Concerning volume one of the book, The Sunday Times reviewer Oscar Turnill wrote that  "Fleming was right in judging the children's market ripe for the ... cliff hanger" and praised his "avuncular and knowledgeable storytelling", which was matched by Burningham's illustrations.

Adaptations
Daily Express serialisation (1964)Chitty-Chitty-Bang-Bang was serialised in the Daily Express newspaper in five episodes over the course of a week, from Monday 19 October 1964, to Friday 23 October 1964.Chitty Chitty Bang Bang (1968 film)
A film loosely based on the novel was made in 1968, with a screenplay written by Roald Dahl and Ken Hughes, directed by Hughes. It was produced by Albert R. "Cubby" Broccoli, who had made five James Bond films previously. The film starred Dick Van Dyke as Caractacus Potts and Sally Ann Howes as Truly Scrumptious, an additional character who was not in Fleming's novel. Two actors from the Bond franchise were involved in the film: Desmond Llewelyn and Gert Fröbe, who played the parts of scrap-dealer Coggins and Baron Bomberst, respectively. A novelisation of the film was published by Pan Books in 1968, written by author John Burke.'Chitty Chitty Bang Bang (2002 musical)On 16 April 2002, Chitty Chitty Bang Bang, a stage musical based on the film, opened at the London Palladium theatre. It was directed by Adrian Noble with musical staging and choreography by Gillian Lynne, and starred Michael Ball. This version of the show closed in September 2005. It was the longest-running show ever at the London Palladium, taking over £70 million in its three-and-a-half-year run. The show was nominated for two Laurence Olivier Awards.

A Broadway version opened on 28 April 2005 at the Lyric Theatre (then the Hilton Theatre) in New York City and closed on 31 December 2005, after 34 previews and 284 regular performances, grossing $27,509,505 during its run. The production was nominated for five 2005 Tony Awards.Radio adaptation (2011)A one-hour adaptation of the novel by Sherry Ashworth was broadcast on BBC Radio 4 Extra (formerly BBC Radio 7) on 3 April 2011, starring Imogen Stubbs as the voice of Chitty and Alex Jennings as Caractacus Potts.Sequels (2011, 2012 and 2013)'Three sequels to Fleming's work have been written by Frank Cottrell Boyce. The first—Chitty Chitty Bang Bang Flies Again—was published on 7 October 2011. The second, Chitty Chitty Bang Bang and the Race Against Time was released on 27 September 2012. A third sequel, Chitty Chitty Bang Bang Over the Moon'' was released on 26 September 2013.

References

Bibliography

External links
 
 
 

1964 British novels
British novels adapted into films
British novels adapted into plays
British children's novels
British fantasy novels
Novels by Ian Fleming
Novels published posthumously
Chitty Chitty Bang Bang
Jonathan Cape books
Flying cars in fiction
1964 children's books
Novels adapted into radio programs